The 2012 FAM Women's Football Championship was the inaugural staging of the FAM Women's Football Championship in the Maldives. The competition began on 15 December 2012, and ended on 30 December 2012.

Teams
5 teams participated in the competition.

 Sun Hotels and Resorts
 Maldives National Defence Force (MNDF)
 Iskandhar School Parent Teacher Association (Iskandhar School PTA)
 Maldives Broadcasting Corporation (MBC)
 L. Gan Thudi Society for Thudi Advancement and Recreation (L. STAR)

League round
''Times are Islamabad, Karachi (UTC+5).
Top 4 teams among this league round will be qualifies for the semi finals.

Semi final

Final

Awards
Awards were given by the president of the Football Association of Maldives, Ali Azim.

Best 5 players
 Fadhuwa Zahir (MNDF)
 Aminath Zahiya (Sun)
 Fathimath Shaliya (Iskandhar School PTA)
 Fathimath Afza (Sun)
 Aminath Leeza (MNDF)

Fair play team
 L. Gan Thudi Society for Thudi Advancement and Recreation (L. STAR)

Prize money
The prize money given to the top two teams.

References

External links
 Women's Championship at Haveeru Online

FAM Women's Football Championship
Women
2012 in women's association football